Eric Jensen (born February 1, 1970) is a Canadian professional race team owner and a former professional race car driver from Toronto, Ontario, Canada.

As a driver, Jensen competed in the Atlantic Championship and Firestone Indy Lights series during a 13-year career from 1997 to 2009.

Jensen currently owns the professional car racing team Jensen MotorSport.

Jensen MotorSport continues to operate race cars in several professional race series. In 2011, Jensen MotorSport operated race cars in the Firestone Indy Lights which is a race series that runs together with IndyCar. The team operated three cars during the 2011 season for drivers Oliver Webb, David Ostella, and Juan Pablo Garcia. The team scored a season best result of 3rd at the Edmonton Indy and set a lap record for Indy Lights at Indianapolis Motor Speedway.

Jensen MotorSport competed in the Atlantic Championship for eleven years from 1999 until 2009. Eric Jensen won the Team Owner of the Year award in the final season of the series in 2009. Jensen drivers in 2009 included Markus Niemela and Matt Lee. Henri Karjalainen drove for the team in 2008.

Under Champ Car sanction, in the 2007 season Jensen operated race cars in the Champ Car Atlantic series for drivers Frankie Muniz, Tom Sutherland, and Dominick Muermans.  In 2006, the team operated race cars in the Champ Car Atlantic series for drivers Tim Bridgman and Steve Ott. Jensen MotorSport also operated race cars for Frankie Muniz and Tom Sutherland in the Formula BMW USA championship.

External links
Jensen MotorSport official website

1970 births
Racing drivers from Ontario
Indy Lights drivers
Atlantic Championship drivers
Sportspeople from Toronto
Living people